Kadrolli  is a village in the southern state of Karnataka, India. It is located in the Bailhongal taluk of Belgaum district in Karnataka.

Demographics
 Indian census, Kadrolli had a population of 5,481 comprising 2,763 males and 2,718 females.

See also
 Belgaum
 Districts of Karnataka

References

External links
 http://Belgaum.nic.in/

Villages in Belagavi district